Kerameri or Kerimeri is a mandal in Komaram Bheem district in the state of Telangana in India. It is also home to the Kumuram Bheem Tribal Museum.

Villages
The villages in Kerameri mandal , Goyagaon, Karanjiwada, Kerameri, Khairi, Kothari, Modi, Nishani, Parandholi, Sangvi and Surdapur.
Kallegam,Babejarri. patnapur, Lendiguda

Transport

Telangana's Kashmir "Kerameri" Ghat roads can be reached by Bus and trains.

By Road - They are number of buses from Hyderabad MGBS to Komaram Bheem. From Komaram Bheem we can reach this place within 40 minutes.

By Rail - Trains from Secunderabad to Nagpur stretch. Main stations to reach this place is Asifabad Road-ASAF, Sirpur Kaghaznagar-SKZR.

References 

Villages in Komaram Bheem district
Mandals in Komaram Bheem district